Dundas station may refer to:

 Dundas railway station, Sydney, a railway station in Sydney, New South Wales, Australia
 Dundas station (Toronto), a subway station in Toronto, Ontario, Canada
 Dundas station (Dundas, Ontario), a demolished station in Dundas, Ontario, Canada